Korund is a company based in Dzerzhinsk, Russia. It is part of Petrochemical Holding GmbH.

The Korund State Enterprise produces a variety of chemical products for military, industrial, agricultural, and household use. It also produces corundum and articles made of it, as well as an assortment of consumer goods.

The company was founded on September 25, 1915, as a mineral acid plant. By October 1916, production of sulfur and nitric acid was mastered for the purposes of manufacture with their help of explosives. Since 1920, the factory produces superphosphate.

References

External links
 Official website

Chemical companies of Russia
Russian brands
Companies based in Nizhny Novgorod Oblast
Ministry of the Chemical Industry (Soviet Union)
Chemical companies of the Soviet Union